Caleb Powell Haun Saussy (born February 15, 1960) is University Professor at the University of Chicago.

Research 
Saussy's first book, The Problem of a Chinese Aesthetic (Stanford UP, 1993), discussed the tradition of commentary that has grown up around the early Chinese poetry collection Shi jing (known in English as the Book of Songs). This was followed by Great Walls of Discourse and Other Adventures in Cultural China (Harvard University Asia Center, 2001), an account of the ways of knowing and describing specific to China scholarship, and Sinographies, co-edited with Steven Yao and Eric Hayot. Other interests are reflected in the edited books Women Writers of Traditional China: An Anthology of Poetry and Criticism (with Kang-i Sun Chang and Charles Kwong, 1999), Partner to the Poor: A Paul Farmer Reader (2009) and Ernest Fenollosa / Ezra Pound, The Chinese Written Character: A Critical Edition (with Jonathan Stalling and Lucas Klein, 2008). Saussy and Perry Meisel supplied introductions, notes and errata to the reissue of Wade Baskin's translation of Ferdinand de Saussure's Course in General Linguistics (2011). In 2016 he published The Ethnography of Rhythm: Orality and Its Technologies (Fordham University Press), which subsequently won the Scaglione Prize for Comparative Studies of the MLA. In 2017 followed Translation as Citation: Zhuangzi Inside Out (Oxford University Press). With Rivi Handler-Spitz and Pauline Chen Lee, he edited and translated A Book to Burn And A Book to Keep (Hidden): Selected Writings of Li Zhi (Columbia University Press, 2016). He is an avid cyclist, memorizer of verb paradigms and lyric poetry, and contributor to a variety of art installations including the innovative Martin Luther King, Jr. Library in San Jose, California. His articles range widely, from the imaginary universal languages of Athanasius Kircher to Chinese musicology to the great Qing dynasty novel Honglou meng and the history of oral-poetry theory. He edited the American Comparative Literature Association'''s 2004 report on the state of the discipline. With others, he maintains a blog, www.printculture.com. Among his editorial responsibilities are: co-editor, Chinese Literature: Essays, Articles, Reviews; co-editor, Critical Inquiry; editorial board member, Zhongguo xueshu / China Scholarship, Comparative Literature, Warring States Papers, Modern Philology, Cross-Currents, and Health and Human Rights: An International Journal'', etc. With Lazar Fleishman of Stanford University, he edits a series, "Verbal Art," now published by Fordham University Press.

Biography 
Saussy is the son of socialite Lola Haun Saussy and Tupper Saussy, an American musician and conspiracy theorist. Raised in suburban Nashville, Tennessee, he attended Deerfield Academy and then received his B.A. (Greek and comparative literature) at Duke University in 1981. He received his MPhil and Ph.D. at Yale University in comparative literature. Between college and graduate school, he studied linguistics and Chinese in Paris and Taiwan. Saussy was previously an assistant professor (1990–95) and associate professor (1995–97) at the University of California, Los Angeles. He was an associate professor, full professor, and chair of the Department of Comparative Literature at Stanford University, prior to joining the Yale faculty in 2004. Saussy moved to the University of Chicago in 2011.

Honors
President (2009-2011) of the American Comparative Literature Association 
Fellow of the American Academy of Arts and Sciences (since 2009).
Graduate President (2007-2011) of the Alpha of Connecticut Chapter of Phi Beta Kappa.

References

External links
Web site at the University of Chicago

1960 births
Duke University alumni
Angier B. Duke Scholars
Living people
People from Nashville, Tennessee
Chinese literature
Yale University faculty
Deerfield Academy alumni
University of Chicago faculty